Shannon may refer to:

People
 Shannon (given name)
 Shannon (surname)
 Shannon (American singer), stage name of singer Shannon Brenda Greene (born 1958)
 Shannon (South Korean singer), British-South Korean singer and actress Shannon Arrum Williams (born 1998)
 Shannon, intermittent stage name of English singer-songwriter Marty Wilde (born 1939)
 Claude Shannon (1916-2001) was American mathematician, electrical engineer, and cryptographer known as a "father of information theory"

Places

Australia
 Shannon, Tasmania, a locality
 Hundred of Shannon, a cadastral unit in South Australia
 Shannon, a former name for the area named Calomba, South Australia since 1916
 Shannon River (Western Australia)

Canada
 Shannon, New Brunswick, a community
 Shannon, Quebec, a city
 Shannon Bay, former name of Darrell Bay, British Columbia
 Shannon Falls, a waterfall in British Columbia

Ireland
 River Shannon, the longest river in Ireland
 Shannon Cave, a subterranean section of the River Shannon
 Shannon Pot, source of the River Shannon
 Shannon Estuary
 Shannon, County Clare, Ireland, a town near Shannon Airport
 Shannon Region, unofficial region in Ireland

United States
 Shannon, Alabama
 Shannon, Georgia
 Shannon, Illinois
 Shannon, Kansas
 Shannon, Kentucky
 Shannon, Mississippi
 Shannon, North Carolina
 Shannon, Texas
 Shannon County, Missouri
 Oglala Lakota County, South Dakota, formerly known as Shannon County
 Shannon River (Minnesota)
 Shannon Creek, a stream near North Cascades National Park, Washington
 Lake Shannon, a reservoir in Whatcom County, Washington

Elsewhere
 Shannon, New Zealand
 Shannon Island, Greenland

Arts and entertainment
 Shannon (1961 TV series), starring George Nader (syndicated)
 Shannon (1981 TV series), starring Kevin Dobson (Columbia Broadcasting System)
 "Shannon" (song), a song by Henry Gross

Organisations
 Shannon Development, a development company in Ireland
 Shannon Racing, a defunct motor racing team
 Shannon Racing Cars, a defunct Formula One constructor
 Shannon RFC, a rugby club in Limerick

Transportation
 Shannon Airport, Ireland
 Shannon (locomotive),  an 0-4-0WT steam locomotive built in 1857
 Shannon-class lifeboat, a British type of lifeboat

Other uses
 Earl of Shannon, a title in the Irish peerage
 , several Royal Navy ships
 Shannon (horse) (1941–1955), Australian Hall-of-Fame racehorse
 Technological University of the Shannon: Midlands Midwest, an Irish university
 shannon (unit), the information content of one bit
 Shannon, a satellite - see Lynk Global

See also
 Shannon index, a biodiversity index
 Noisy-channel coding theorem, sometimes called Shannon Limit, the theoretical limit to capacity of a communication channel
 Shannan (disambiguation)